Clavus canalicularis, common name the ear turrid, is a species of sea snail, a marine gastropod mollusk in the family Drilliidae.

Description
The shell grows to a length of 27 mm.

The white shell shows a broad chestnut band below the periphery. The tuberculations of the periphery are often long and spinose. Usually a revolving row of nodules appears below the middle of the body whorl.

Distribution
This marine species occurs in the Red Sea and in the Indo-West Pacific off Vietnam, Indonesia, Papua New Guinea and the Philippines; off Australia (Northern Territory, Queensland).

References

Röding, P.F. 1798. Museum Boltenianum sive Catalogus cimeliorum e tribus regnis naturae quae olim collegerat Joa. Hamburg : Trappii 199 pp.
 Lamarck, J.B.P.A. de M. 1816. Liste des objets représentés dans les planches de cette livraison. pp. 1–16 in Lamarck, J.B.P.A. de M. Tableau encyclopédique et méthodique des trois règnes de la nature. Vers, coquilles, mollusques et polypiers. Paris : Agasse Part 23 pp. 1–16, pls 391–488. 
 M.M. Schepman, Full text of "Siboga expeditie" 
Powell, A.W.B. 1966. The molluscan families Speightiidae and Turridae, an evaluation of the valid taxa, both Recent and fossil, with list of characteristic species. Bulletin of the Auckland Institute and Museum. Auckland, New Zealand 5: 1–184, pls 1-23
 Wells F.E. (1991) A revision of the Recent Australian species of the turrid genera Clavus, Plagiostropha, and Tylotiella (Mollusca: Gastropoda). Journal of the Malacological Society of Australia 12: 1–33.
 Wilson, B. 1994. Australian Marine Shells. Prosobranch Gastropods. Kallaroo, WA : Odyssey Publishing Vol. 2 370 pp.

External links
 

canalicularis
Gastropods described in 1798